Andrea Tonti (born 16 February 1976 in Osimo) is an Italian professional road bicycle racer for UCI Professional Continental team Carmiooro NGC.

Palmares 

 GP Fred Mengoni (2006)
 Euskal Bizikleta - 1 stage (2006)

External links

Italian male cyclists
1976 births
Living people
Sportspeople from the Province of Ancona
Cyclists from Marche